Candor Central School District is a public school district located in  Candor, New York, approximately 20 miles south of Ithaca, NY. The District serves students in the Town and Village of Candor, as well as parts of Owego to the South, Willseyville to the North, and Brooktondale to the Northeast.  During the 2016–17 school year, it had an enrollment of 740 students in grades K-12. It has two academic buildings located on one campus. The elementary school holds students in grades K-6 and the Junior/Senior High School, grades 7–12.

List of schools
High School (Grades 7–12):
Candor Junior / Senior High School
Elementary School (Grades K-6):
Candor Elementary School

Athletics 
Candor Central School District is part of the Interscholastic Athletic Conference and Section IV of the New York State Public High School Athletic Association (NYSPHSAA). In 2016, it entered into a merger agreement with neighboring Spencer-Van Etten School District with the purpose of combining team sizes for teams with historically low enrollment. Merged sports teams include football, cross country, wrestling, and field hockey.

Sports teams that are not merged are classified as Class D in the NYSPHSAA. Sports teams that are merged are usually Class C teams.

See also
 List of school districts in New York

References

External links
 

School districts in New York (state)
Education in Tioga County, New York